Montana's large size, and diverse Ecological systems of Montana make it home to a diverse array of flora and fauna.

This is a list of flora and fauna of Montana related articles.

 Club-mosses and mosses of Montana
 There are at least 23 species of Club-mosses and 153 species of Mosses found in Montana.,
 Coniferous plants of Montana
 There are at least 20 species of Gymnosperms or Coniferous plants in Montana.
 Ferns of Montana
 Horsetails of Montana
 Lichens of Montana
 There are at least 41 species of lichens, Ascomycota known to exist in Montana.
 Dicotyledons of Montana
There are at least 2109 species of dicotyledons found in Montana according to the Montana Field Guide.
 Monocotyledons of Montana
 There are at least 615 species of Monocotyledons found in Montana.

Fauna

 Amphibians and Reptiles of Montana
 Montana is home to 14 amphibian species and 20 species of reptiles.
 Birds of Montana
 There are at least 427 species of birds found in Montana.
 Molluscs of Montana
 There are at least 42 species of freshwater bivalves (clams and mussels) known in Montana. There are also at least 155 species of gastropods found in Montana.
 Crustaceans of Montana
 There are at least 30 species of crustaceans found in Montana.
 Fish of Montana
 There are at least 31 game and 59 non-game fish species known to occur in Montana.
 Flatworms and leeches of Montana
 Insects of Montana
 Mammals of Montana
 There are at least 19 large mammal and 96 small mammal species known to occur in Montana.
 Millipedes of Montana

Notes

Further reading
 
 
 

 
 
 
 
 
 
 
 
 
 
 
 
 

Flora of the Rocky Mountains
Fauna of the Rocky Mountains